Lakka is a liqueur produced in Finland which derives its flavor from the cloudberry fruit.

Lakka may also refer to:

 Lakka, Greece
 Lakka language, an Mbum language of Cameroon
 Lakka, Sierra Leone
 Lakka, a Linux distribution using RetroArch aimed at retro-gaming (Nintendo 64, PlayStation, etc)

See also
 Laka (disambiguation)
 Lakkia